Steven Fechter is an American playwright.   He is best known for his play, The Woodsman, and co-wrote the screenplay for the film version starring Kevin Bacon and Kyra Sedgwick.

Fetcher grew up in Los Angeles and graduated from Binghamton University.  He holds the PhD form the Graduate Theatre Program at Hunter College.

Fetcher teaches screenwriting, film, and theater at John Jay College and at the Fashion Institute of Technology in New York.

Frecher's play, The Woodsman, was adapted for film with Nicole Kassell.  The screen play, co-written by Fechter and Kassell, won the Slamdance Film Festival screen play competition and premiered at Sundance. The screenplay was also nominated for the Humanitas Prize for filmwriting.

References

External links

21st-century American dramatists and playwrights
American male screenwriters
Living people
Year of birth missing (living people)
American male dramatists and playwrights
Writers from Los Angeles
Hunter College alumni
Binghamton University alumni
John Jay College of Criminal Justice faculty
Fashion Institute of Technology faculty
21st-century American male writers
Screenwriters from New York (state)
Screenwriters from California
21st-century American screenwriters